The 2013–14 St. Francis Brooklyn Terriers women's basketball team represented St. Francis College during the 2013–14 NCAA Division I women's basketball season.  The Terrier's home games were played at the Generoso Pope Athletic Complex. The team has been a member of the Northeast Conference since 1988. St. Francis Brooklyn was coached by John  Thurston, who was in his second year at the helm of the Terriers.

For the 2013–14 season the Terriers made a pair of appearances on ESPN3 for the first time in their history. The 2013–14 Terriers improved to 6–2 on the season for the first time since the 1976–77 season. After going 11–2 by winning 5 straight games, the Terriers for the first time in program history were ranked inside the top 25 of a national basketball poll at 25th in the CollegeInsider.com Top 25 Mid-Major Poll. The 2013–14 squad set the single-season school record with 19 wins during the year. The Terriers also notched 10 conference wins, the most in St. Francis Brooklyn women's basketball history to date (the record was broken by the 2018–19 squad, 12 wins).

Roster

Schedule

|-
!colspan=9 style="background:#0038A8; border: 2px solid #CE1126;;color:#FFFFFF;"| Non-Conference Regular Season

|-
!colspan=9 style="background:#0038A8; border: 2px solid #CE1126;;color:#FFFFFF;"| Northeast Conference Regular Season

|-
!colspan=9 style="background:#0038A8; border: 2px solid #CE1126;;color:#FFFFFF;"| Northeast Conference tournament

See also
2013–14 St. Francis Brooklyn Terriers men's basketball team

References

St. Francis Brooklyn
St. Francis Brooklyn Terriers women's basketball seasons
St. Francis Brooklyn Terriers women's basketball
St. Francis Brooklyn Terriers women's basketball